Silver Lake or Kitts Pond is a lake at Wakefield in Washington County, Rhode Island, United States. It is considered part of the Saugatucket River watershed, although it does not discharge into the Saugatucket River itself.

References

Lakes of Rhode Island
Bodies of water of Washington County, Rhode Island
South Kingstown, Rhode Island